Higuerote Airport  is an airport serving the coastal town of Higuerote in the Miranda state of Venezuela.
 
The Higuerote non-directional beacon (Ident: HOT) is located on the field.

See also
Transport in Venezuela
List of airports in Venezuela

References

External links
 OpenStreetMap - Higuerote
 OurAirports - Higuerote
 SkyVector - Higuerote Airport

Airports in Venezuela